Mwanahamisi Omary Shurua (born 16 October 1989) is a Tanzanian professional footballer who plays as a forward for Simba Queens and the Tanzania women's national team.

International career 
In 2018, Shurua scored one goal in their run to winning the 2018 CECAFA Women's Championship after scoring Ethiopia 4–1 in their final group match.

Honours 

 CECAFA Women's Championship: 2018

References

External links 
 

1989 births
Living people
Tanzanian women's footballers
Women's association football forwards
Tanzania women's international footballers